The Women's scratch was held on 21 October 2017.

Results

References

Women's scratch
European Track Championships – Women's scratch